XHAGA-FM is a radio station in Aguascalientes Aguascalientes, Mexico. It is owned by Radio AGS, S.A. de C.V. a subsidiary of Grupo Radiofónico ZER, and carries the Los 40 format from Radiópolis.

History
XEAGA-AM 1200 received its concession on October 29, 1993. It was originally owned by Radio Familiar, S.A., and broadcast with 1 kW of power.

The station was sold in 2007 and migrated to FM in 2011.

References

Radio stations in Aguascalientes
Mass media in Aguascalientes City
Radio stations established in 1993
1993 establishments in Mexico